Alberto Leanizbarrutia (born 1 April 1963 in Elorrio) is a former Spanish cyclist. He notably participated in 17 Grand Tours and is one of only 35 Riders in the entire history of cycling to have completed the Vuelta a Espana, Giro d'Italia and Tour de France in the same season, which he accomplished in 1991. In the 1991 Giro he won the Intergiro classification.

Major results

1986
3rd Trofeo Luis Puig
1987
1st stage 5 Tour of the Basque Country
3rd Circuito de Getxo
1988
1st Tour de Vendée
1990
1st Prologue Vuelta a Cantabria
2nd Troféu Joaquim Agostinho
1991
 Intergiro classification Giro d'Italia
1993
3rd Clásica de Alcobendas
1994
2nd Clásica de Alcobendas

References

1963 births
Living people
Spanish male cyclists
People from Durangaldea
Sportspeople from Biscay
Cyclists from the Basque Country (autonomous community)